John Pagkos (born January 17, 1936) is an American sprint canoer who competed in the late 1950s and early 1960s. At the 1956 Summer Olympics in Melbourne, he was eliminated in the heats of the K-2 1000 m event. Four years later in Rome, he was eliminated in the repechages of the K-1 4 × 500 m event.

Results

References
Sports-reference.com profile

1936 births
American male canoeists
Canoeists at the 1956 Summer Olympics
Canoeists at the 1960 Summer Olympics
Living people
Olympic canoeists of the United States